Harry Baillie (5 February 1884 – 17 March 1959) was a British wrestler. He competed in the men's freestyle lightweight at the 1908 Summer Olympics.

References

External links
 

1884 births
1959 deaths
British male sport wrestlers
Olympic wrestlers of Great Britain
Wrestlers at the 1908 Summer Olympics
Place of birth missing